Play the Game may refer to:

 Play the Game (film), 2009 romantic comedy film starring Andy Griffith
 Play the Game (American game show), a 1946 TV game show
 Play the Game (Irish game show), a 1984-1995 TV game show
 "Play the Game" (song), a song by Queen
 Play the Game (NGO), an international NGO and conference on sports ethics